Gorrie Lake is a lake in Timiskaming District, Ontario, Canada, about  east of Temagami.

Hydrology
The primary inflows are two unnamed creeks on the western side. The primary outflow, at the eastern side, is an unnamed creek to Fourbass Lake, which flows via the Matabitchuan River into Lake Timiskaming, then via the Ottawa River into the St. Lawrence River.

References

Lakes of Timiskaming District